Lethe verma  , the straight-banded treebrown, is a species of Satyrinae butterfly found in the  Indomalayan realm

Subspecies
L. v. verma  Northwest India, Kashmir,  Assam
L. v. sintica   Fruhstorfer, 1911   Sikkim, Assam, Yunnan
L. v. stenopa    Fruhstorfer, 1908   Burma, Thailand - Indo China, South China, Hainan
L. v. robinsoni    Pendlebury, 1933   Peninsular Malaya (Cameron Highlands)
L. v. satarnus    Fruhstorfer, 1911   West China
L. v. cintamani    Fruhstorfer, 1909   Taiwan

References

verma
Butterflies of Asia
Butterflies of Indochina